"Tramp" is a soul blues song with funk elements, written by West Coast blues artists Lowell Fulson and Jimmy McCracklin.  First recorded by Fulson in 1967, it was his highest-charting single since "Reconsider Baby" in 1954. The song was covered by Otis Redding in a duet with Carla Thomas, and this version reached No. 2 on Billboard R&B chart.

Background and release
Jules Bihari, the owner of Fulson's label, Kent Records, disliked the song at first: "Oh, he hated 'Tramp', Jules [Bihari] did.", Fulson recalled. However, when Bihari previewed the song for two influential disc jockeys, the response was "Hush! Man, get me my copy, quick.  You sitting on a gold mine, talking about you want to hear some blues. You better get that record out."  Fulson elaborated:

When Kent released it as a single, "Tramp" became a hit, peaking at number five in the Billboard R&B chart. The song was also Fulson's most popular single in the broader, pop-oriented Billboard Hot 100 chart, where it reached number 52.

As one of Fulson's best-known songs, "Tramp" appears on numerous compilations, including the popular 1967 Kent album, also titled Tramp.  For the album cover, Fulson, who normally wore suits, posed dressed up as a railroad yard hobo:

Lyrics  

The song is partly narrative, with the singer ignoring the criticism of his unsophisticated appearance:

Critical reception
Fulson's "Tramp" has been described as a "comfortably laid-back but groovin' soul-blues workout" and "a loping funk-injected workout [which restored] the guitarist to R&B stardom", by AllMusic reviewers.  The entertainment magazine LA Weekly called it "a near-perfect slice of barbecued funk".

Otis and Carla

Otis Redding recorded "Tramp" as a duet with Carla Thomas for Stax Records. The song was first included on the joint album by Redding and Thomas, King & Queen (1967).  Described as "playful" by Dahl, it was released as a single only months after Fulson's.  Credited to "Otis and Carla", the duo's version outsold Fulson's original and peaked at number two on Billboard's Top Selling R&B singles and number 26 on the Hot 100 charts.

In Dynamic Duets: The Best Pop Collaborations from 1955 to 1999, author Bob Leszczak describes their rendition:

Leszczak points out that the Otis and Carla single peaked higher in the UK, where it reached number 18 on the UK Singles Chart (Fulson's single did not appear in the UK charts).  He also notes "the song's beat likely influenced 'You Haven't Done Nothin'' by Stevie Wonder seven years later".

Charts

Other renditions
In 1968, Fulson's "Tramp" was used as the basis for "The Champ", an organ riff-driven instrumental by a group of session musicians dubbed the Mohawks.  The piece has been "widely sampled in rap for this riff and for its breakbeat rhythm".

In 1985, Salt-n-Pepa sampled the Otis and Carla rendition of the song, but kept the original title. Selected as number six in the list of "Vibe's 10 Greatest Otis Redding-sampled Songs", their rendition is described as "the perfect vehicle for the female hip-hop pioneers’ brazen diss of the cheating opposite sex". The duo's song reached number 31 on Billboard Hot Black Singles chart.

In 1991, DJ Muggs "made 'Tramp' the principal building block of 'How I Could Just Kill a Man,' the grimy fuck-it-all gun blast that announced the arrival of Cypress Hill", according to LA Weeklys Josh Kun. He added, "The song was the highlight of Cypress Hill's 1991 debut album, which sounded like nothing else in hip-hop, east or west."

References 

1967 singles
Lowell Fulson songs
Otis Redding songs
Blues songs
1967 songs
Stax Records singles
Kent Records singles